Las Condes is a commune of Chile located in Santiago Province, Santiago Metropolitan Region. The area is inhabited primarily by upper-mid- to high income families, and known in the Chilean collective consciousness as home to the country's economic elite. Most of Las Condes′ commercial activity is situated along Apoquindo Avenue, which is called colloquially "Sanhattan". It belongs to the Northeastern zone of Santiago de Chile.

Demographics
The population grew by 20.1% (41,830 persons) between the 1992 and 2002 censuses. The 2006 projected population was 283,226.

Las Condes is home to a significant and growing Jewish population. The Jewish community of Las Condes has their own synagogue, Talmud Torah, and rabbi. Las Condes is also home to the Jewish sports club Estadio Israelita.

Indicators
Average annual household income: US$67,672 (PPP, 2006)
Population below poverty line: 2.3% (2006)
Regional quality of life index: 87.42, high, 2 out of 52 (2005)
Human Development Index: 0.933, 2 out of 341 (2003)

Administration
As a commune, Las Condes is a third-level administrative division of Chile administered by a municipal council, headed by an mayor as the main executive officer who is directly elected every four years. The 2021–2024 mayor is Daniela Peñaloza Ramos (UDI). The communal council has the following members:

 Chile Vamos (5)
 Julio Dittborn Cordúa (UDI)
 Patricio Bopp Tocornal (UDI)
 Javiera Kretschmer Soruco (Evopoli)
 Catalina San Martín Cavada (Evopoli)
 Luis Hadad Acevedo (RN)

 Republican Party (4)
 Sergio Melnick Israel (PREP)
 Vanessa Kaiser Barents-von Hohenhagen (PREP)
 Catalina Ugarte Millán (PREP)
 Marie Claude Mayo De Goyeneche (PREP)

Broad Front
 Isidora Alcalde Egaña (RD)

Within the electoral divisions of Chile, Las Condes is represented in the Chamber of Deputies by Gonzalo Fuenzalida (RN), Karin Luck (RN), Catalina del Real (RN), Francisco Undurraga (Evopoli) and Guillermo Ramírez (UDI) for the Conservatives, and Tomás Hirsch (PH) for the Frente Amplio (left-wing) as part of the 11th electoral district, (together with Vitacura, Lo Barnechea, La Reina and Peñalolén). The commune is represented in the Senate by Manuel José Ossandón (RN) and Carlos Montes (PS) as part of the 8th senatorial constituency (Santiago-East).

Economy
LAN Airlines, LATAM Airlines Group, and PAL Airlines have their headquarters in Las Condes.

Google Chile's headquarters are in Las Condes, as is Conversica's LATAM headquarters.

Entertainment 
Las Condes has over 500 restaurants covering multiple world cuisines.

Education

The Deutsche Schule Santiago (or Colegio Alemán de Santiago) maintains two campuses in Las Condes: the Las Condes which has Years 7-12 and the school administration, and the Cerro Colorado campus, which houses preschool.

In addition the Scuola Italiana Vittorio Montiglio is located in Las Condes.

Gallery

References

External links

  Municipality of Las Condes

Communes of Chile
Geography of Santiago, Chile
Jewish communities
Jews and Judaism in Chile
Las Condes
Populated places established in 1901
Condes